The 2010 African Handball Cup Winners' Cup was the 26th edition, organized by the African Handball Confederation, under the auspices of the International Handball Federation, the handball sport governing body. The tournament was held from April 7–17, 2010 at the Palais des Sports de Ouagadougou in Ouagadougou, Burkina Faso, contested by 16 teams and won by Zamalek Sporting Club of Egypt.

Draw

Preliminary rounds
Times given below are in GMT UTC+0.

Group A

* Note:  Advance to quarter-finals Relegated to 9-16th classification

Group B

* Note:  Advance to quarter-finals Relegated to 9-16th classification

Group C

* Note:  Advance to quarter-finals Relegated to 9-16th classification

Group D

* Note:  Advance to quarter-finals Relegated to 9-16th classification

Quarter-finals - Group 1

* Note:  Advance to semi-finals Relegated to 5-8th classification

Quarter-finals - Group 2

* Note:  Advance to semi-finals Relegated to 5-8th classification

Knockout stage

5-8th bracket

Championship bracket

9–16th qualification - Group 1

* Note:  Advance to 9-12th classification Relegated to 13-16th classification

9–16th qualification - Group 2

* Note:  Advance to 9-12th classification Relegated to 13-16th classification

9-12th bracket

13-16th bracket

Final standings

Awards

References

External links
 Tournament profile at goalzz.com
 General calendar - cahbonline
 Results - cahbonline

African Handball Cup Winners' Cup
Cup Winners' Cup
2010 in Burkinabé sport
International sports competitions hosted by Burkina Faso